Tapologo is a 2007 documentary film.

Synopsis 
In Freedom Park, a squatter settlement in South Africa, a group of HIV-infected former sex-workers, created a network called Tapologo. They learned to nurse their community, transforming degradation into solidarity and squalor into hope. Catholic bishop Kevin Dowling participates in Tapologo, and raises doubts on the official doctrine of the Catholic Church regarding AIDS and sexuality in the African context.

References 

2007 films
South African documentary films
2007 documentary films
Spanish documentary films
Documentary films about HIV/AIDS
HIV/AIDS in South Africa
Religion and HIV/AIDS